The National Main Heroes Cemetery in Kalibata, colloquially known as Kalibata Heroes Cemetery ( or TMP Kalibata), is a military cemetery in Kalibata, South Jakarta, Indonesia. It was built in 1953 and opened on 10 November 1954. Bacharuddin Jusuf Habibie was the first Indonesian President to be buried on the cemetery following his death on 11 September 2019. Former Indonesian foreign minister Agus Salim, who died 6 days before the cemetery was opened, was the first senior politician buried in the cemetery. There were also 121 bodies moved from Heroes Cemetery in Ancol.

More than 7,000  military casualties and veterans from Indonesian War of Independence are buried there. This includes many veterans of the Imperial Japanese Army who stayed in the Dutch colony after World War II of their own free will and fought for Indonesian independence.

Burial criteria 
Act No. 20 of 2009, which regulates the orders, decorations, and medals of Indonesia, also regulates the eligibility for burial in the cemetery. Before the promulgation of the Act, anyone with the consent of the Ministry of Social Affairs could be buried in the cemetery; after its promulgation, only the following people may be buried there:
 People designated as a National Hero of Indonesia; or
 Recipients of the Star of the Republic of Indonesia or the  Star of Mahaputra.

Japanese
Up to 3,000 Japanese volunteers fought against the Dutch. Of these approximately 1,000 died, 1,000 returned to Japan after Indonesia's independence, and 1,000 remained and were naturalized in Indonesia. Japanese Prime Minister Junichiro Koizumi visited on 13 January 2002, Japanese Prime Minister Shinzo Abe visited on 21 August 2007. and Japanese Prince Akishino and Princess Akishino visited on 19 January 2008.

Notable people buried in the cemetery
Indonesians

Japanese

 Rahmat Shigeru Ono

See also
 Yasukuni shrine
 Giri Tunggal Heroes' Cemetery
 Kusumanegara Heroes' Cemetery

References

 Kiyoyuki Hatakeyama, Masayasu Hosaka (2004), Rikugun Nakano Gakko Shusen Hishi, Shinchosha

External links

 

Indonesia–Japan relations
National cemeteries
Indonesian National Revolution
Cemeteries in Jakarta
Military cemeteries